Capanica is a moth genus of in the family Heliodinidae.

Species
Capanica astrophanes Meyrick, 1917
Capanica lamprolitha Meyrick, 1917

References

Heliodinidae